Halicz is a peak in the Bieszczady Mountains in southern Poland. Its height is 1,333 meters.

It is one of the highest peaks in the mountain range and from its summit one can look out over the rest of the Bieszczady in both Poland and Ukraine.

See also 

 Bieszczady National Park

Halicz
Landforms of Podkarpackie Voivodeship